Luigi Braschi Onesti (1745– 9 February 1816), duca di Nemi, was a nephew of Pope Pius VI, who granted him his dukedom.

Life and family 
Luigi's mother Giulia Braschi was Pius's sister, and his father was count Girolamo Onesti. His younger brother was Romoaldo Braschi-Onesti, Cardinal and Camerlengo.

On Luigi's marriage to the richest lady of the Falconieri family, he was granted permission by Pius to build Palazzo Braschi off Piazza Navona, and from 1787 and 1795 he built another neoclassical Palazzo Braschi at Terracina, as a private residence for his uncle.

Construction on his Rome palazzo was suspended from February 1798 – 1802 during the Napoleonic occupation of the city, when the French occupied the house and confiscated the recently acquired antiquities Onesti had housed there.  Braschi Onesti moved into the palazzo in 1809, when Napoleon declared Rome an imperial city, and was declared mayor of Rome, though the palazzo was still unfinished at his death seven years later.

Collection 

Some of his antiquities were purchased by the Crown Prince of Bavaria, later King Ludwig I and are conserved at the Glyptothek that he built in Munich.

The Braschi collection included:
Esquilache Immaculate Conception by Bartolomé Esteban Murillo (Now in the Hermitage Museum)
Mystical Marriage of Saint Catherine by Beccafumi (Now in the Hermitage Museum)
Equestrian portrait of Francisco de Moncada by Anthony van Dyck (Now in the Louvre Museum)
Christ Driving the Merchants from the Temple by Bartolomeo Manfredi (Now in the Fine Arts Museum of Libourne)
The Madonna and child with Saint Anne and the infant saint John the Baptist by a follower of Raphael
Self portrait by Andrea del Sarto (Now in Alnwick Castle)
Statues of Otho, Severus Alexander, Antinous, Cybele, Asclepius, Faustina the Elder and Faustina the Younger (Now in the Louvre Museum)
Sculpture of a Child and Goose by Boethus (Now in the Louvre Museum)
Statue of Lucius Verus (Now in a British private collection)
The Braschi Antinous (Now in the Vatican Museums)
Venus Braschi, Artemis Braschi (Now in the Glyptothek, Munich)

References

 treccani.it, Braschi Onesti, Luigi.

Dukes of Italy
1745 births
1816 deaths